The Mentor Philosophers was a series of six books each covering a period of philosophical thought, published by the New American Library.   Each book was edited by an esteemed contemporary philosophy academic and contained analysis of a group of philosophers from a chosen period.

The series was very influential during the 1950s and 1960s and went a number of editions in paperback.  Literary historian Gilbert Highet called it a "very important and interesting series".

Lists of books
Philosophy books
Encyclopedias of philosophy
Philosophy of religion literature
Political philosophy literature
New American Library books